Police-General Bambang Hendarso Danuri (born October 10, 1952) was Chief of the Indonesian National Police (Kapolri) from 1 October 2008 to October 2010. He replaced Chief of  Police General Sutanto who was relieved of duty. He was nominated by the Indonesian President, Susilo Bambang Yudhoyono.

Honours
: Honorary Commander of the Order of Loyalty to the Crown of Malaysia - Tan Sri (P.S.M.) (2010)

References

1952 births
People from Bogor
Indonesian police officers
Chiefs of police
Living people
Sundanese people
Honorary Commanders of the Order of Loyalty to the Crown of Malaysia